Pterochelus duffusi is a species of sea snail, a marine gastropod mollusk in the family Muricidae.

Description

Distribution

References

Muricidae
Gastropods described in 1936